Joy Wai-lok Lai (born 18 August 1998) is an Australian badminton player. She competed at the 2014 Summer Youth Olympics in Nanjing, China. Lai was the champion at the Waikato International tournament in the women's singles event.

Achievements

Oceania Championships 
Women's singles

Women's doubles

Mixed doubles

BWF International Challenge/Series 
Women's singles

Women's doubles

  BWF International Challenge tournament
  BWF International Series tournament
  BWF Future Series tournament

References

External links 
 

Living people
1998 births
Sportswomen from Victoria (Australia)
Australian female badminton players
Badminton players at the 2014 Summer Youth Olympics